Conflans-Sainte-Honorine is a commune in the Yvelines department in the Île-de-France region in north-central France. It is located in the northwestern suburbs of Paris,  from the center of Paris.

The commune was originally named for its geographic position at the confluence of the Seine and Oise rivers. The village was given the addition "Sainte Honorine" in the 13th century after the female Saint Honorina, whose relics had been kept there since AD 876.

Partly on account of its strategic position, Conflans-Sainte-Honorine is considered the capital of the French inland waterways, and the right bank of the river Seine is still lined with barges (although these are now used mainly as houseboats). Every year in June, the town celebrates the Pardon national de la batellerie in remembrance of its former importance to inland shipping.

Population

Transport
Conflans-Sainte-Honorine is served by Conflans-Sainte-Honorine station on the Transilien Paris-Saint-Lazare regional rail line.

It is also served by Conflans-Fin-d'Oise station which is an interchange station on Paris RER line A and on the Transilien Paris-Saint-Lazare suburban rail line.

Education
 the city's schools had 4,258 students. There are nine public preschools, seven public elementary schools, one private school, and an école régionale du premier degré (ERPD).

Elementary schools:
 École élémentaire Chennevières
 École élémentaire Clos-d’en-Haut
 École élémentaire Côtes-Reverses
 École élémentaire Gaston-Rousset
 École élémentaire Grandes-Terres
 École élémentaire Henri-Dunant
 École élémentaire Paul-Bert

The médiathèque Blaise-Cendrars has digital documents and multimedia services.

Samuel Paty, a middle school teacher at Collège du Bois d'Aulne in Conflans-Sainte-Honorine, was killed and beheaded in 2020 in an Islamist terrorist attack.

Parks and recreation
Centre aquatique de Conflans has the town's pool.

Personalities

Charb (1967–2015), satirical caricaturist and journalist, was born in Conflans
 Samuel Coco-Viloin (born 1987), track and field athlete
 Gérard Genette (1930–2018), literary critic and theorist of literature, spent part of his childhood there
 Jean-Paul Huchon, president of the regional council for Île-de-France, Socialist party, former mayor of Conflans (1994–2001)
 Michel Rocard (1930–2016), French prime minister (1988–1991), Socialist party, mayor of Conflans (1977–1994)
 Nicolas Roche (born 1984), Irish professional cyclist, was born here
Nicolas Szerszen, volleyball player at Ohio State University. AVCA national Player of the Year (2016). NCAA tournament Most Outstanding Player (2017).

Twin towns – sister cities
Conflans-Sainte-Honorine is twinned with:
 Großauheim (Hanau), Germany
 Chimay, Belgium
 Ramsgate, England, United Kingdom

See also
 Communes of the Yvelines department
2020 Islamist attack

References

External links

 Official website 
 Conflans tourist office 

 
Communes of Yvelines